Sylbert is a surname. Notable people with the surname include:

 Anthea Sylbert (born 1939), American costume designer 
 Paul Sylbert (1928−2016), American production designer, art director and set designer
 Richard Sylbert (1928–2002), American production designer and art director